Serhiy Hivivych Koridze, (Ukrainian: Сергій Гівівич Корідзе; born 6 December 1975 in Odessa) is a Ukrainian futsal player.

Career 
Serhiy Koridze was a football player in his youth. He began his professional career in 1992 for the Chornomorets-2 Odesa. In 1994, he played for FC Anzhi Makhachkala, but turned to futsal in 1995. Koridze played for the Lokomotyv Odessa. In 1998, he moved to the Interkas Kyiv. In 2001 Koridze went to Russia, where he later played for the Dina Moscow, Spartak Shchelkovo, TTG-Yugra Yugorsk and KPRF Moscow.

In the Ukraine national futsal team Serhiy Koridze was twice a silver medalist of UEFA Futsal Championship - in 2001 and 2003. Both of these tournaments, he left with the rank of top scorer.

He also became the top scorer for the Ukraine national team.

Honours

Club 

 UEFA Futsal Championship runner-up: 2001, 2003
 Futsal European Clubs Championship third place: 1997
 Ukrainian Men's Futsal Championship winner (5): 1995/96, 1996/97, 1997/98, 1998/99, 1999/00
 Russian Futsal Super League runner-up: 2003/04
 Ukrainian Men's Futsal Cup winner (3): 1997, 1998, 2001
 Russian Futsal Cup winner: 2005

Individual 
 UEFA Futsal Championship top scorer (2): 2001, 2003
 Ukraine national team top scorer (65)
 Ukrainian Men's Futsal Championship top scorer (3)
 Russian Futsal Super League top scorer: 2003/04
 Russian Futsal Super League best forward (2): 2001/02, 2002/03
 Order of the Association of Futsal Odessa region Honour

References

External links 
 Profile at Russian Futsal Association 
 

1975 births
Living people
Footballers from Odesa
Ukrainian men's futsal players
Ukrainian footballers
Ukrainian expatriate footballers
Ukrainian expatriate sportspeople in Russia
Expatriate footballers in Russia
Ukrainian people of Georgian descent
FC Anzhi Makhachkala players
FC Chornomorets-2 Odesa players
FC Dnister Ovidiopol players
Ukrainian Second League players
Ukrainian Amateur Football Championship players
Association footballers not categorized by position